Colt .45 is a 1950 American Western film directed by Edwin L. Marin and starring Randolph Scott, Ruth Roman, and Zachary Scott. Reissued under the title Thundercloud, the film served as the loose basis for the television series Colt .45 starring Wayde Preston, which premiered seven years later. Written by Thomas W. Blackburn, author of the lyrics to The Ballad of Davy Crockett, the film is about a gun salesman and gunfighter who tracks down a killer who stole two new Colt .45 repeating pistols leaving a trail of dead bodies behind him. The revolvers used in the movie were actually first model .44 Caliber Colt revolving belt pistols made in 1849 and reaching final form by 1850. Scott correctly demonstrated how to load them so the producers of the film were most likely aware of the anachronism in the title.

Plot
In the town of Red Rock, gun salesman Steve Farrell demonstrates the new Colt .45 repeating pistols to the sheriff. The demonstration is interrupted when men arrive to transfer one of the prisoners to another jail. As he's being led away, prisoner Jason Brett grabs the pistols, shoots the sheriff, and escapes. Convinced that Farrell was involved in the escape, the townspeople arrest the innocent gun salesman. Brett initiates a campaign of robberies and cold-blooded murder, with regular guns being no match for his Colt .45 pistols.

Farrell is released from jail due to a lack of evidence. He tracks Brett into Texas and comes across a band of Indians whom Brett has killed to provide cover for a stagecoach robbery. The only survivor of the attack, Walking Bear, tells Steve about Brett's plan. Farrell jumps onto the stage to fight off Brett's gang with his own set of Colt .45s. The only passenger on the stage, Beth Donovan, tries to prevent him from fighting off the robbers.

After Brett's gang retreats, Farrell stops the stage and notices a white scarf hanging outside the stagecoach window. Believing it to be a signal to the robbers, Farrell suspects that Beth is part of the gang; she escapes on horseback while Farrell is helping the wounded stagecoach driver. Farrell does not know that Beth is the wife of Paul Donovan, one of Brett's associates. Beth returns to her home, which is being used by Brett as a hideout. Although she believes that her husband has been forced to work with Brett, he is actually plotting with the killer to take over the nearby town of Bonanza Creek.

Unknown to the citizens of Bonanza Creek, Sheriff Harris is working with Brett and his gang. When Farrell arrives in town, Harris agrees to make him his deputy. Harris then rides out to Brett's hideout and warns him that Farrell is in town. Farrell learns Beth's identity. Harris encourages him to ride out to her house, knowing Brett and his gang will be lying in wait, but Farrell is able to evade the ambush with the help of Walking Bear and his Indians.

Back at the hideout, Beth overhears Paul plotting with Brett and realizes her husband is actively working with the gang. After she denounces her husband, Paul locks her in a store room. She manages to escape and hurries into town to reveal what she knows, but as she rides past Paul, he shoots her. Hearing the shots, Farrell takes her in his arms and rides off seeking refuge with Walking Bear and his people. After being treated for her wound, Beth warns Farrell about Brett's plan to take over Bonanza Creek.

The Indians discover Paul's body, shot in the back by a .45. Along the trail, Harris and members of the gang set a trap and capture Farrell, but the Indians come to his rescue and kill his captors. Then they ride to Bonanza Creek and quietly go about killing Brett's men in the streets. The injured Harris makes his way back to town to warn Brett, who's holed up in the jail with Beth as his hostage. When Farrell and the Indians arrive at the jail, Brett uses Beth as a shield, but Beth breaks away. Farrell enters the jail alone and sees Brett is out of ammunition. He puts down his .45s and the two men fight. During the struggle, Brett goes for Farrell's guns and Farrell shoots him. Farrell walks out into the street and is embraced by Beth.

Cast
 Randolph Scott as Steve Farrell
 Ruth Roman as Beth Donovan
 Zachary Scott as Jason Brett
 Lloyd Bridges as Paul Donovan
 Alan Hale, Sr. as Sheriff Harris
 Ian MacDonald as Miller
 Chief Thundercloud as Walking Bear
 Luther Crockett as Judge Tucker
 Walter Coy as Carl
 Charles Evans as Redrock Sheriff
 Carl Andre as Indian
 Clyde Hudkins, Jr. as Indian
 Leroy Johnson as Indian

Production
Colt .45 was filmed on location at Iverson Movie Ranch in Chatsworth, California, Vasquez Rocks in Agua Dulce, California, and in Santa Clarita, California.

Reception

Box office
According to Warner Bros records the film earned $2,003,000 domestically and $1,118,000 foreign.

Television series
Warner Bros. loosely based a television series of the same name upon the film in 1957, with Wayde Preston starring as a gun salesman named Christopher Colt. When Preston left the series, he was replaced by Donald May as Sam Colt, Jr., who also sold their family's pistols across the West when not momentarily embroiled in a gunfight. The series was eventually marketed in the United Kingdom as The Colt Cousins and ran for three seasons.

References

External links
 
 
 
 

1950 films
1950 Western (genre) films
American Western (genre) films
Films adapted into television shows
Films directed by Edwin L. Marin
Films scored by William Lava
Films shot in Los Angeles County, California
Films shot in the Mojave Desert
Warner Bros. films
1950s English-language films
1950s American films